Zuzax is an unincorporated community in Bernalillo County, New Mexico, United States.  It lies on New Mexico State Highway 333, former U.S. Highway 66, about eleven miles (18 km) east of Albuquerque.  It is now largely an area of subdivisions.  An exit for Zuzax exists on nearby Interstate 40.  It was known in the 1950s for its tourist store and short chair lift ride which ascended a small hill behind the store.

See also

References

External links

Unincorporated communities in New Mexico
Unincorporated communities in Bernalillo County, New Mexico